Gerd (Saturn LVII), provisionally known as S/2004 S 25, is a natural satellite of Saturn. Its discovery was announced by Scott S. Sheppard, David C. Jewitt, and Jan Kleyna on October 7, 2019 from observations taken between December 12, 2004 and March 22, 2007. It was given its permanent designation in August 2021. On 24 August 2022, it was officially named after Gerðr, a jötunn from Norse mythology. She is the wife of Freyr and the personification of fertile soil.

Gerd is about 4 kilometres in diameter, and orbits Saturn at an average distance of 21.174 Gm in 1150.69 days, at an inclination of 173° to the ecliptic, in a retrograde direction and with an eccentricity of 0.442.

References

Norse group
Irregular satellites
Moons of Saturn
Discoveries by Scott S. Sheppard
Astronomical objects discovered in 2019
Moons with a retrograde orbit